SS Arabic, originally built as Berlin, was a passenger steamship launched on 7 November 1908 which was built by the AG Weser shipbuilding company in Germany. Her gross register tonnage was advertised at 16,786 tons. She made her maiden voyage on 1 May 1909 from New York to Genoa and Bremerhaven. In September 1914 she became an auxiliary cruiser with the Imperial German Navy as a minelayer. 

Berlin remained in Norway for the duration of the war. In 1919 she was transferred to Britain as war reparations and put into service as the White Star Line's Arabic. In 1931 she was discarded and broken up for scrap.

History

Early career

Berlin was built in 1908 by AG Weser of Bremen for the North German Lloyd shipping line, and saw service on the Genoa to New York City route prior to the outbreak of the First World War. 
In August 1914 Berlin was at Bremerhaven undergoing repairs, and was taken over by the Imperial German Navy for service as an auxiliary cruiser.

World War I
Berlin was intended for use as a fast minelayer and also to operate as a commerce raider. This was part of Germany's kleinkrieg campaign, to wear down Britain's numerical advantage by using mines and other devices to sink warships, or to divert them from fleet operations into trade protection.  Berlin was converted for the role at Kaiserliche Werft ( KWW ) in Wilhelmshaven and equipped with minelaying equipment and 200 mines. She also carried two 105mm guns, and several heavy machine guns.

Commissioned in October 1914 under the command of KzS Hans Pfundheller, the ship's first mission was laying a mine field off the north-west coast of Ireland against British trade. This she succeeded in doing, laying 200 mines on 23 October off Tory Island. The first victim of Berlin's minefield was the British cargo ship SS Manchester Commerce of 5,363 GRT.  By chance the Grand Fleet had evacuated Scapa Flow under the threat of U-boat attacks (the Flow being undefended at that time) and were stationed temporarily at Lough Swilly. On 27 October vessels of the Grand Fleet sailed into Berlin’s minefield; the new dreadnought battleship  was struck and damaged, sinking later as efforts were made to tow her to safety. The trans-Atlantic liner  was also in the area, with a full complement of passengers, but she escaped hitting any of Berlin’s mines, thus avoiding a further tragedy and a major diplomatic incident.

Berlin sought to return to Germany, but put in at Trondheim with storm damage. Having outstayed her 24 hours grace and unfit to leave port, she was interned by the Norwegians on 18 November 1914.

Post War Career

In December 1919 she was a war reparation to P&O Line. About a year later in 1920 she was purchased by the White Star Line, based in Liverpool and was refitted in Portsmouth, it was then she was renamed the SS Arabic. In September 1921 she made her maiden voyage as a White Star Line ship, via the Southampton to New York route. Afterwards, she sailed on the Mediterranean to New York service until 1924 when she was moved to the Hamburg to New York route, later that year her passenger accommodation was modified, and on 29 October 1926 Arabic made her first voyage under charter to the Red Star Line and resumed doing so until 1930 when she reverted to the White Star Line and her passenger accommodation was again modified. Less than one year later she was sold for breaking up at Genoa.

References

Bibliography

External links 

 The Ship List

Ships of the White Star Line
1908 ships